New College is the name or nickname of many academic institutions, including:

Antarctica
 New College Valley, Ross Island

Australia
 New College, University of New South Wales, Sydney

Canada
 New College, University of Toronto, Toronto

India
 The New College, Chennai, South India

United Kingdom
 North East Worcestershire College Redditch and Bromsgrove
 New College Durham, County Durham
 New College, Edinburgh, Edinburgh
 New College Leicester, Leicester
 New College London, St John's Wood, London
 New College Nottingham, former further education college in Nottingham.
 New College, Oxford, University of Oxford
 New College School, Oxford
 New College, Pontefract Pontefract
 University of Southampton New College, an undergraduate college of the University of Southampton that existed from 1997 to 2006
 New College, Swindon, Swindon
 New College, Telford, Wellington
 New College Worcester, Worcester
 New College of the Humanities, Bloomsbury, London

United States
 New College at Frisco, University of North Texas
 New College Berkeley, California
 New College of Florida, Sarasota, Florida
 New College of California, San Francisco Bay Area, California, now defunct
 New College, University of Alabama, Tuscaloosa, Alabama
 New College of Interdisciplinary Arts and Sciences, Arizona State University, Phoenix, Arizona
 Before it was named in 1639, Harvard College was often referred to as "the New College"; it is debatable whether or not this was ever a name in the usual sense of the word
 New College, Teachers College, Columbia University was an undergraduate teacher education college that existed from 1932 to 1939

See also
New School (disambiguation)